Alessandro Celli (born 28 January 1994) is an Italian football player. He plays for Südtirol on loan from Ternana.

Club career
He made his Serie C debut for Lupa Roma on 31 August 2014 in a game against Lecce.

On 30 November 2018, he signed with Teramo.

On 27 August 2019 he joined Ternana on a 1-year contract.

On 5 January 2023 he went to Südtirol on loan.

References

External links
 

1994 births
Footballers from Rome
Living people
Italian footballers
Lupa Roma F.C. players
Calcio Foggia 1920 players
S.S. Teramo Calcio players
Ternana Calcio players
F.C. Südtirol players
Serie B players
Serie C players
Serie D players
Association football defenders